Bethanie Mattek-Sands and Lucie Šafářová were the defending champions, but decided not to compete together. Mattek-Sands played alongside Heather Watson, but lost in the quarterfinals to Andreja Klepač and Katarina Srebotnik. Šafářová teamed up with Tímea Babos, but lost in the first round to Kateryna Bondarenko and Olga Savchuk.

Ekaterina Makarova and Elena Vesnina won the title, defeating Simona Halep and Monica Niculescu in the final, 6–3, 7–6(7–5).

Seeds
The top four seeds received a bye into the second round.

Draw

Finals

Top half

Bottom half

References
Doubles Draw

Rogers Cup Doubles
Rogers Cup - Women's Doubles
Women's Doubles
Rogers